Hemipteroseius is a genus of mites in the family Otopheidomenidae. There are at least three described species in Hemipteroseius.

Species
These three species belong to the genus Hemipteroseius:
 Hemipteroseius ageneius
 Hemipteroseius antilleus
 Hemipteroseius vikrami

References

Mesostigmata
Articles created by Qbugbot